Galhinna (pronounced ; , pronounced ) is a village situated in the Kandy District, Central Province, Sri Lanka.

Etymology
The name Galhinna is derived from the Sinhalese "gal" and "hena", meaning "stone fence". The name refers to the area's rocky landscapes.

History

The general area of Galhinna is surrounded by range of mountains and is mainly by tea plantations and rubber estates. It has a rich history and holds an important place in business education. The area is thought to have been inhabited from as early as the 19th century AD.

Galhinna is home to Al Manar Central College, Galhinna, established in 1934. This public school provides education for approximately 1,500 pupils from elementary to GCE Advanced Level.
  
The Galhinna Grand Mosque is another important place in the village.  The grand mosque in the village is one of the oldest in Sri Lanka. Next to it is the Islamic Madrasa named Jamiathul Faththah Arabic College, which has been one of the wealthiest Islamic institutions in Sri Lanka for the past two centuries. The village has several small mosques and a few Buddhist temples in the surrounding areas.
Another girls' Islamic Madrasa is located at Thaqwa Gardens in Galhinna named Dharuth Thaqwa Girls Arabic College, officially started on 23 January 2008. The first batch has passed out in 2012.

Demographics
Galhinna has an estimated population of 18,507. The majority of the people living in Galhinna are Muslims surrounded mostly by Sinhala villages. Tamil is the major language spoken in Galhinna by the majority of the population. The other languages spoken are Sinhala and English. Galhinna is a cold village and it is frequently covered with fog during noon time.

References

Populated places in Kandy District